Mt Gravatt Hawks FC is an Australian football (soccer) club from Mount Gravatt, Queensland, a suburb of Brisbane.  The club was formed in 1960 and has a prestigious history as holders of several titles including the Ampol Cup, State Championship and several State League Premierships. The club currently plays in the Brisbane Premier League.

History
Mt Gravatt Soccer Club was founded in 1960 and over many years has prioritised the development of junior players.  The club was originally based at the Mt Gravatt Showgrounds but as the popularity of soccer grew the club relocated to more extensive surroundings at Dittmer Park, Klumpp Road. The concept of a soccer club was originally put forward by the management committee of the Mt Gravatt Youth and Recreation Club and for the first couple of years the club was known as Mountain Rangers before changing to Mt Gravatt Junior Soccer Club in 1962.  In those early years the club concentrated on junior soccer but in 1965 a feeder arrangement was established with the Excelsior Club, based at Stone's Corner and the revamped team won promotion to Queensland Division 3. In 1966 the name of the senior team was changed from Mt Gravatt Excelsior to Mt Gravatt Soccer Club and a further promotion followed in 1967.

The most successful period in the club's history was in the early 1980s when the club achieved 4 premiership titles, winning the Queensland State League in 1980 and 1981 and the Brisbane Premier League in 1983 in 1984.  One of their premiership successes in 1981 was further consolidated with the club going on to win the Queensland Grand Final and become state champions.

The club also achieved a number of cup successes at that time winning the President's Trophy in 1981 and again in 1984 and the Golden Circle Trophy in 1986. However their biggest cup success came a few years later in 1991 when Mt Gravatt lifted the Ampol Cup, the Queensland State cup competition.

Mt Gravatt Soccer Club entered the National League Cup in 1980 and again in 1981. In 1980 the club won 1–0 away to Brisbane City in the first round but lost 4–2 at home to Brisbane Lions in the second round (the last 16 of the competition). The following season they departed the competition in the first round after losing 3–1 away to Brisbane City.

Perhaps the most prestigious match that the club has hosted was the game against the Australian U23 Olympics team in July 1997 which proved a close encounter with the home side going down 2–1.

Mt Gravatt is affiliated to Football Brisbane and is currently one of the larger clubs in Brisbane with over 400 juniors, 160 senior players and 45 women and junior girls. There are fourteen Senior Men's teams with Brisbane Premier League and Reserves, U18, City League 2, 3, 4, 5, 6, 7, O'35s and O'45s. The Women compete in the Women's Capital League and City League competition and the junior players in in-house programs from Under 3 - Under 8 and Football Brisbane competitions from Under 8 to Under 16.

The success of the club's junior section is formidable with 4 current Australian internationals, namely Matt McKay, Jade North, Jon McKain and Nathan Coe, having been members of the club.

Season to season

Players

Brisbane Premier League and Reserve Squad: 

Abdi Ali

Ali Maisam

Ben Farquhar

Brandon Blatchford 

Celestine Yawatu 

Deacon Galea

Domenic Stevens-Robert

Dylan Rose

Izumi Sekino

Jacky Holmes 

Jacob Downey 

Jarred Kool

Jesse Shepherd 

Joseph Cunnane

Joshua Brown

Juan Esteban Aristizabal 

Juan Melo

Kieren Strachan 

Lachlan Buckingham 

Levi Thomas

Liam South

Logan Ford

Mark Kartadinata

Mathew Berkeley

Matthew Andrews

Matthew Grigg 

Mohamed Hersi

Saeed Mohamed 

Sami Munir

Shunta Tanabe

Tarquin Smith

Todd Powe 

Tyson Harrington

Wigang Noh

Yuttana Taotong 

Zaki Ahmed

Honours
Queensland Grand Final: 1981 Winners
Queensland State League: 1980 Winners
Queensland State League: 1981 Winners
Brisbane Premier League: 1983 Winners
Brisbane Premier League: 1984 Winners
Brisbane Premier Division One: 2005 Winners
Queensland President's Trophy: 1981 Winners
Queensland President's Trophy: 1984 Winners
Queensland Golden Circle Trophy: 1986 Winners
Queensland Ampol Cup: 1991 Winners

The following international players were members of the club as juniors:
 Matt McKay
 Jon McKain
 Jade North
 Nathan Coe
 Katrina Gorry
 Laura Alleway
 Alicia Ferguson

References

External links
Official Website

Association football clubs established in 1960
Soccer clubs in Brisbane
Brisbane Premier League teams
1960 establishments in Australia